"Retrospect for Life" is the first single from rapper Common's third album One Day It'll All Make Sense. It features production from James Poyser and No I.D., vocals from Lauryn Hill and bass guitar playing by Vere Isaacs. Its autobiographical lyrics weigh the choices of abortion and birth for a woman impregnated by Common. The lyrics as well as a "mellow, piano-driven beat" has caused Dan Menella to call it the most memorable track on Common's third album. Kevin Powell of Rolling Stone considers it to be the centerpiece of its album, and Leo Stanley of Allmusic similarly boasts of its significant emotional impact. Lauryn Hill's verse embodies portions of "Never Dreamed You'd Leave in Summer" by Stevie Wonder, while the song's beat samples "A Song for You" by Donny Hathaway. A music video directed by Lauryn Hill was made for it. Two of its b-sides, "Invocation" and "Hungry," received low budget music videos.

Track listing

A-side
 "Retrospect for Life (Radio Edit)" (2:14)
 "Retrospect for Life (Album Version)" (5:23)
 "Retrospect for Life (Instrumental)" (5:23)

B-side
 "Invocation" (2:14)
 "Hungry" (2:33)
 "Real Nigga Quotes" (5:23)

See also
List of Common songs

References

1997 singles
Common (rapper) songs
Lauryn Hill songs
Songs about abortion
Song recordings produced by No I.D.
1996 songs
Songs written by Common (rapper)
Songs written by James Poyser
Songs written by No I.D.
Songs written by Stevie Wonder
Songs written by Syreeta Wright
Relativity Records singles